The Washington House of Representatives is the lower house of the Washington State Legislature, and along with the Washington State Senate makes up the legislature of the U.S. state of Washington. It is composed of 98 Representatives from 49 districts, each of which elects one Senator and two members of the House. They are elected to separate positions with the top-two primary system. All members of the House are elected to a two-year term without term limits. The House meets at the State Capitol in Olympia.

Leadership of the House of Representantatives
The Speaker of the House presides over the House of Representatives. The Speaker and the Speaker Pro Tem are nominated by the majority party caucus followed by a vote of the full House. As well as presiding over the body, the Speaker is also the chief leadership position and controls the flow of legislation. In the absence of the Speaker the Speaker Pro Tem assumes the role of Speaker. Other House leaders, such as the majority and minority leaders, are elected by their respective party caucuses relative to their party's strength in the House.

The Speaker of the House during the first session of the 65th legislature (2019) was Democrat Frank Chopp (D-Seattle) of the 43rd Legislative District. He stepped down at the end of the session and John Lovick (D-Mill Creek) of the 44th Legislative District served as speaker pro tempore until the second session, when Laurie Jinkins (D-Tacoma) was elected speaker. The Majority Leader is Pat Sullivan (D-Covington) of the 47th Legislative District. The Republican Minority Leader is J.T. Wilcox (R-Roy) of the 2nd Legislative District.

Composition

Members (2023-2025, 68th Legislature)

 *Originally appointed
 #Sworn in early to fill vacant seat
 †Had previous tenure in Washington House of Representatives
 ^Redistricted during current tenure
 ‡Originally elected in special election
 §Member of no caucus

Notable former members
The first women elected were Frances Cleveland Axtell and Nena Jolidon Croake in 1912.

Past composition of the House of Representatives

See also
Washington State Capitol
Washington State Legislature
Washington State Senate
List of Washington state legislatures

References

External links

Washington House of Representatives
Map of Legislative Districts

Washington State Legislature
State lower houses in the United States